Physician, heal thyself, sometimes quoted in the Latin form, is an ancient proverb appearing in Luke 4:23. There, Jesus is quoted as saying, "Ye will surely say unto me this proverb, 'Physician, heal thyself': whatsoever we have heard done in Capernaum, do also here in thy country." Commentators have pointed out the echo of similar skepticism in the taunts that Jesus would ultimately hear while hanging on the cross: "He saved others; himself he cannot save". The shortened Latin form of the proverb, was made famous through the Latin translation of the Bible, the Vulgate, and so gained currency across Europe.

Background
Similar proverbs with a medical theme appear in other Jewish literature. For example, "Physician, physician, heal thine own limp!" can be found in Genesis Rabbah 23:4 (300–500 CE). Such proverbs also appear in literary Classical texts from at least the 6th century BC. The Greek dramatist Aeschylus refers to one in his Prometheus Bound, where the chorus comments to the suffering Prometheus, "Like an unskilled doctor, fallen ill, you lose heart and cannot discover by which remedies to cure your own disease."

Interpretation 
The moral of the proverb in general, containing within itself also a criticism of hypocrisy, is to attend to one's own defects before those in others. This meaning is underlined in the fable of The Frog and the Fox that was attributed to Aesop.

See also 

 The pot calling the kettle black
 List of Latin phrases
 The Mote and the Beam
 Woes of the Pharisees

References 

Proverbs
Classical literature
Gospel of Luke
Sayings of Jesus
New Testament words and phrases
Hypocrisy